Penna may refer to:

 7mm Penna, a handgun cartridge
 Monte Penna, a mountain in northern Italy
 Penna (surname)
 Penna, Tasmania, a suburb of Hobart, Tasmania, Australia
 Penna in Teverina, a comune in Terni, Umbria, Italy
 Penna River, a river of southern India
 Penna., an abbreviation for Pennsylvania
Penda of Mercia, king of Mercia, who is sometimes called Penna of Mercia.

See also
 Della Penna, a surname